The 1978 World Junior Figure Skating Championships were held on March 21–26, 1978 in Megève, France. Sanctioned by the International Skating Union, it was the third edition of an annual competition in which figure skaters compete for the title of world junior champion. Medals were awarded in the disciplines of men's singles, ladies' singles, pair skating, and ice dancing.

Results

Men

Ladies

Pairs

Ice dance

References

World Junior Figure Skating Championships
World Junior
F
International figure skating competitions hosted by France